Frederic Barker (17 March 1808 – 6 April 1882) was the second Anglican bishop of Sydney.

Early life 
Barker was born at Baslow, Derbyshire, England, fifth son of the Rev. John Barker and his wife Jane, née Whyte. He was educated at The King's School, Grantham and Jesus College, Cambridge, where he graduated B.A. in 1831, M. A. 1839. While at Cambridge he was influenced by Charles Simeon. He was made deacon on 10 April 1831 by the Bishop of Rochester; he was ordained a priest on 15 April 1832, and placed in charge of the perpetual curacy of Upton, Cheshire. Subsequently, he was at St Mary's, Edge Hill, an important church in Liverpool, for 19 years. In April 1854 he became vicar of Baslow, and soon afterwards was appointed Bishop of Sydney and was consecrated on 30 November 1854.

Career in Australia 
Barker arrived at Sydney on 25 May 1855, and was installed on 31 May 1855 at the temporary cathedral. Amongst his early tasks were the completion of the arrangements for the building of Moore College for theological students, and the quickening of interest in the completion of St. Andrew's Cathedral, Sydney. He then began a series of visitations in his diocese, then covering an immense area. He soon realized it must be subdivided, and two new dioceses were established--Goulburn in 1863, and Bathurst in 1869. As metropolitan of Australia he was also concerned with the establishment of dioceses at Perth (1856), Brisbane (1859), Grafton and Armidale (1866), Ballarat (1875), and North Queensland (1878).

In 1863 Barker visited England where he succeeded in raising a considerable sum of money for the prosecution of the work of his church, and gave many addresses on Australia in different parts of England. The first synod of the diocese of Sydney met in December 1866, and dealt with many issues such as the relations of the Church in Australia with the Church in England, and the framing of a constitution for the cathedral. In 1868 the re-opening of The King's School, Parramatta, was successfully arranged, with the Reverend G. F. Macarthur as headmaster. In October 1872 the formation of the general synod of the dioceses of Australia including Tasmania was accomplished. Barker visited England again in 1871 and 1877 and was able to bring the needs of the new dioceses before the Society for Propagating the Gospel and other societies. In 1878 steps were taken to provide more adequate religious instruction to children attending state primary schools, and a church buildings loan fund for the diocese of Sydney was established early in 1880.

Late life and legacy
In December 1880 Barker had a stroke of paralysis, and in March 1881 he went to Europe in the hope of recovering his health. There was an improvement for some months, but in March 1882 he had a second attack and died at San Remo, Italy, on 6 April 1882. He married firstly in 1840, Jane Sophia, daughter of John Harden, and secondly in 1878, Mary Jane, daughter of Edward Woods. He had no children.

Barker was 1.96 m (6' 5") tall, dignified and scholarly in appearance. He was deeply evangelical and his teaching was based simply on the Bible. During his episcopacy of 27 years the number of churches and the number of clergy more than doubled. He published Thirty-six Psalms with Commentary and Prayer (1851), and A Charge Delivered to the Clergy of the Diocese of Sydney (1859). He was also a contributor to The Supposed Sacrament of Penance, A Course of Sermons (1838); and On the Rise of the Errors of the Church of Rome, A Course of Sermons (1840).

Due to his height and his abstinence from alcohol, the term 'Bishop Barker' was jocularly applied to the tallest beer glass available in late-19th-century Sydney hotels.

The Sydney North Shore private school, Barker College (founded 1890), was named in honour of Barker by founder Rev. Henry Plume.

References 

 
 K. J. Cable, 'Barker, Frederic (1808 - 1882)', Australian Dictionary of Biography, Volume 3, MUP, 1969, pp 90–94.

External links

 

1808 births
1882 deaths
People from Baslow
Anglican bishops of Sydney
Primates of the Anglican Church of Australia
Alumni of Jesus College, Cambridge
People educated at The King's School, Grantham